Joey Cantens (born December 12, 1986) is a professional basketball coach, currently serving as the Head Coach for Daytona State College. He previously worked at Florida Gulf Coast as an assistant coach, and for professional basketball teams in Germany.

Education
Cantens graduated from Eckerd College in 2009 with a business management degree and continued on to complete his master of science in Sport Management from Florida State University in 2011. Cantens began his playing career at Florida International University before transferring to Eckerd College, which made a Division II NCAA Tournament appearance each year, including a Sweet Sixteen run in 2006–07.

Career
In June 2021, Cantens accepted the Head Coach position at Daytona State College. He inherited a program with just 7 win the previous year and quickly improved that win total to 11 in the 2021-2022. With a full recruiting class the second year, Cantens improved to 27 wins and were Central Conference Champions in Florida's NJCAA Region 8. DSC was ranked as high as 8th in the Nation for NJCAA. Cantens earned Conference Coach of the Year Honors and had 6 players earn All-Conference honors including the Player of the Year.

In the summer of 2018, Cantens was a member of the San Antonio Spurs' coaching staff at the Utah Summer League. In July 2018, he returned to the Florida Gulf Coast University's men's basketball program to serve as assistant under head coach Michael Fly.

In 2016–17, he served as assistant coach at German second-division side White Wings Hanau, followed by one year as assistant coach of MHP Riesen Ludwigsburg in Germany's top-tier Bundesliga, working under head coach John Patrick.

Cantens served as the top assistant coach under Joe Lombardi for the IUP Crimson Hawks during the 2015–16 season. The Crimson Hawks earned the PSAC West regular season championship, the program's sixth overall.

Cantens spent the 2014–15 season as Director of Scouting and Video Operations for the USC Trojans. Cantens rejoined head coach Andy Enfield after working with him at both Florida State and Florida Gulf Coast University. Prior to joining USC's staff, Cantens served as an assistant coach with Leones de Santo Domingo, a professional team in the Dominican Republic. In Santo Domingo, he assisted long-time Puerto Rico national basketball team coach Flor Meléndez, helping the team advance to the league semifinals.

Cantens also served on the staff of the Dominican Republic national basketball team in 2014, which competed at the 2014 FIBA Basketball World Cup in Spain. Kentucky assistant coach Orlando Antigua led the team to a No. 20 world ranking. Cantens also worked under Kentucky coach John Calipari, who served as the Dominican Republic national team coach during the summers of 2011–13. Calipari's staff led the Dominican Republic to its best finish in the FIBA Americas Championship, earning a bronze medal in 2011.

In 2011, Cantens joined the Florida Gulf Coast Eagles men's basketball staff as Director of Basketball Operations under Andy Enfield. Cantens spent three seasons in Fort Myers, which included the Eagles’ unprecedented Sweet 16 run in 2013, and their first-ever Atlantic Sun Conference regular season title in 2014 under former FGCU head coach Joe Dooley (basketball).

Cantens worked as a graduate assistant for the Florida State Seminoles men's basketball program from 2009–11, under coach Leonard Hamilton. Florida State advanced to the NCAA Tournament both seasons, highlighted by a Sweet Sixteen run in 2010–11.

Cantens also served as an assistant coach for AAU program Team Breakdown.

References

1986 births
Living people
Basketball coaches from Florida
American expatriate basketball people in the Dominican Republic
American expatriate basketball people in Germany
Eckerd Tritons men's basketball players
IUP Crimson Hawks men's basketball coaches
Sports coaches from Miami
American men's basketball players
Basketball players from Miami